,   or  is a historical Slavic title, used both as a royal and noble title in different times of history and different ancient Slavic lands. It is usually translated into English as prince or duke, depending on specific historical context and the potentially known Latin equivalents of the title for each bearer of the name.

The title is pronounced and written similarly in different European languages. In Serbo-Croatian and some West Slavic languages, the word has later come to denote "lord", and in Czech, Polish and Slovak also came to mean "priest" as well as "prince/duke". In Sorbian it means simply "Mister" (from "Master".  Compare French  from  "my lord"), and the Catholic title "monsignor" for a priest. Today the term  is still used as the most common translation of "prince" in Slovenian, Bosnian, Croatian and Serbian literature.  is also found as a surname in former Yugoslavia.

Etymology

The word is ultimately a cognate of the English king, the German König, and the Swedish konung. It is generally considered to be an early borrowing from Proto-Germanic kuningaz, a form also borrowed by Finnish and Estonian (kuningas).

Middle Ages
The meaning of the term changed over the course of history. Initially the term was used to denote the chieftain of a Slavic tribe. Later, with the development of feudal statehood, it became the title of a ruler of a state, and among East Slavs ( (knyazhestvo)) traditionally translated as duchy or principality), for example, of Kievan Rus'. In medieval Latin sources the title was rendered as either rex or dux.

In Bulgaria, Boris I of Bulgaria changed his title to knyaz after his conversion to Christianity, but his son Simeon took the higher title of tsar soon in 913. According to Florin Curta, the primary sources have a variety of names for the rulers of the bulgars - such as including ‘rex’, ‘basileus’ and ‘khagan’. However, secondary sources are almost always 'khan'. In Kievan Rus', as the degree of centralization grew, the ruler acquired the title Velikii Knyaz (Великий Князь) (translated as Grand Prince or Grand Duke, see Russian Grand Dukes).

When Kievan Rus' became fragmented in the 13th century, the title Kniaz continued to be used in East Slavic states, including Kiev, Chernihiv, Novgorod, Pereiaslav, Vladimir-Suzdal, Muscovy, Tver, Kingdom of Ruthenia, and in the Grand Duchy of Lithuania.

Russia 

As the Tsardom of Russia gained dominion over much of former Kievan Rus', velikii kniaz (великий князь) (Great Kniaz) Ivan IV of Russia in 1547 was crowned as Tsar. From the mid-18th century onwards, the title Velikii Kniaz was revived to refer to (male-line) sons and grandsons of Russian Emperors. See titles for Tsar's family for details.

Kniaz continued as a hereditary title of Russian nobility patrilineally descended from Rurik (e.g., Belozersky, Belosselsky-Belozersky, Repnin, Gorchakov) or Gediminas (e.g., Galitzine, Troubetzkoy). Members of Rurikid or Gedyminid families were called princes when they ruled tiny quasi-sovereign medieval principalities. After their demesnes were absorbed by Muscovy, they settled at the Moscow court and were authorised to continue with their princely titles.

From the 18th century onwards, the title was occasionally granted by the Tsar, for the first time by Peter the Great to his associate Alexander Menshikov, and then by Catherine the Great to her lover Grigory Potemkin. After 1801, with the incorporation of Georgia into the Russian Empire, various titles of numerous local nobles were controversially rendered in Russian as "kniazes". Similarly, many petty Tatar nobles asserted their right to style themselves "kniazes" because they descended from Genghis Khan.

Finally, within the Russian Empire of 1809–1917, Finland was officially called Grand Principality of Finland.

Polish-Lithuanian Commonwealth 
As noted above, the title knyaz or kniaz became a hereditary noble title in the Grand Duchy of Moscow and the Grand Duchy of Lithuania. Following the union of the Kingdom of Poland and the Grand Duchy of Lithuania, kniaź became a recognised title in the Polish-Lithuanian Commonwealth. By the 1630s – apart from the title pan, which indicated membership of the large szlachta noble class – kniaź was the only hereditary title that was officially recognised and officially used in the Polish-Lithuanian Commonwealth. Notable holders of the title kniaź include Jeremi Wiśniowiecki.

South Slavic countries

In the 19th century, the Serbian term knez (кнез) and the Bulgarian term knyaz (княз) were revived to denote semi-independent rulers of those countries, such as Alexander Karađorđević and Alexander of Battenberg. In parts of Serbia and western Bulgaria, knez was the informal title of the elder or mayor of a village or zadruga until around the 19th century.  Those are officially called gradonačelnik (градоначелник) (Serbia) and gradonachalnik (градоначалник) or kmet (кмет) (Bulgaria).

Bulgaria 
 Prior to Battenberg, the title knyaz was born by Simeon I during the First Bulgarian Empire (9th–10th century). At the height of his power, Simeon adopted the title of tsar ("emperor"), as did the Bulgarian rulers after the country became officially independent in 1908.
 As of Bulgaria's independence in 1908, Knyaz Ferdinand became Tsar Ferdinand, and the words knyaz and knyaginya began to be used instead for the tsar's children – the heir to the throne, for example, held the title Knyaz Tarnovski (Prince of Turnovo").

Bosnia
In early medieval Bosnia knez (knjaz, књаз) was a title used, along župan and duke titles, for Bosnian rulers. One of the first such ruler, recorded in historic documents and later historiography, was Stephen, Duke of Bosnia.

Later it was held by several of most powerful magnates (in Bosnia vlastelin) of the era, sometime along with an office title given to person through service to the monarch, such as Grand Duke of Bosnia, which was office of the supreme military commander of the realm. Other noble titles included the count, the duke and the prince. The title is equivalent to that of prince. Among most influential of Bosnian nobleman with the title knez was Pavle Radinović of Radinović-Pavlović noble family, while other include several noblemen from Radojević-Mirković family, such as Batić Mirković. Further families that bear this title are for example Šantić noble family and most members of Hrvatinić.

Croatia
 knez was the monarchial title used by the medieval rulers of the Duchy of Pannonian Croatia and the Duchy of Littoral Croatia from the 7th to the 10th century, who were mostly titled as dux and rarely as princeps in Latin sources and translated as Dukes in English ones.
 knez was, in the Late Middle Ages, a hereditary feudal title borne by Croatian vassal noble families who were great territorial magnates of high social class (such as knezovi Bribirski (Counts of Bribir), knezovi Krčki (Counts of Krk) and knezovi Zrinski (Counts of Zrin)) and went by the title of comes in Latin and Count in English.

Montenegro
 knjaz (књаз) was the ruler title used by the Petrović-Njegoš dynasty in Principality of Montenegro from 1852 until the establishment of Kingdom of Montenegro in 1905, translated as "Prince".

Serbia
 knez (кнез) or knjaz (књаз) is a common term used in Serbian historiography for Serbian rulers in the Early Middle Ages, who were titled archon in Greek.
 knez (кнез) or knjaz (књаз) was a noble title used by medieval rulers of the Principality of Serbia, Duklja, and Moravian Serbia.
 knez (кнез) was a title borne by local Serbian chiefs under the Ottoman Empire. It was another name for the Ottoman Turkish rank of kodjabashi, held by local Christian chiefs.
 obor-knez (обор-кнез) was a title borne by elected local native Serbian chiefs of the nahiyah (district of a group of villages) in the Ottoman Sanjak of Smederevo (also known as the Belgrade Pashaluk). The obor-knez was senior chief and responsible for his district's people and was their spokesman (intermediary) in direct relations with the Pasha, though usually through the sipahi, and was in charge of the transfer of taxes levied on the villages.
 knez (кнез) or knjaz (књаз) was the monarchial title used by Miloš Obrenović in Principality of Serbia, translated as "Prince". Serbia known as Kneževina Srbija (Кнежевина Србија) was de facto independent since 1817, becoming de jure independent with the 1869 constitution. The successors of Miloš used the title until 1882 when Serbia was elevated into a kingdom.

See also
 Voivode
 Boyar
 Hospodar
 Knyazev
 Knez (Vlach leader)

References

Sources
 Mihaljčić, R. (1999) Knez. in: Ćirković S.i R.Mihaljčić [ed.] Leksikon srpskog srednjeg veka, Beograd, str. 299-301

External links
 

Bulgarian noble titles
Ukrainian noble titles
 
Slavic titles
Noble titles

 
Titles of national or ethnic leadership
Serbian royal titles
Serbian noble titles
Croatian noble titles
Bosnian noble titles
Bosnian royal titles